MFR is an Independent Local Radio station based in Inverness, owned and operated by Bauer as part of the Hits Radio Network. It broadcasts to Moray, the Scottish Highlands and South West Aberdeenshire. 

As of December 2022, the station has a weekly audience of 119,000 listeners according to RAJAR.

Station information

MFR operates two separate services on 97.4 FM (from the Mounteagle transmitter) and 1107 AM. The first voice heard on MFR, shortly after 6:30am on 23 February 1982, was Dave Cochrane. The longest serving presenter on MFR of 33 years was Tich McCooey, leaving on 29 May 2015.

MFR on FM largely broadcasts contemporary and chart music-led programming alongside hourly news bulletins and peak-time traffic updates. The majority of the station's output is produced and broadcast from its Inverness studios. In recent years, MFR opted out on Saturday evenings for a weekly bilingual music programme in English and Scots Gaelic, which also aired on Argyll FM, Cuillin FM, Isles FM, Nevis Radio and Two Lochs Radio.

History
The station began broadcasting on 23 February 1982. A year later, the station was making a profit.

Until August 2014, MFR 2 on AM and DAB aired specialist programming on Sunday - Friday evenings with automated music broadcast at all other times. In September 2014, the station axed its specialist output and began carrying programming from Bauer's 'Greatest Hits Network' of Scottish AM stations, switching to the Bauer City 2 network in January 2015. Since January 2019 it is part of the Greatest Hits Radio network. MFR 2 continues to air local news, sports coverage and traffic updates.

MFR 3 launched on Monday 19 January 2015, broadcasting on DAB and online as a locally branded relay of The Hits aimed at 15-25-year-olds, with opt-outs for advertising. MFR 3 ceased broadcasting on 31 August 2017 and was replaced with a single national feed of The Hits, which was replaced ten months later with Hits Radio.

In addition to the main services, there is a local community station which opts into MFR during the daytime, broadcasting local programming produced by a non-profit community group during the evenings.

 Caithness FM (Caithness), used to use 102.5 FM from MFR but now broadcasts under its own licence on 106.5 FM.

There also used to be five other community stations taking MFR:

 KCR 107.7FM (Keith, Moray), formerly known as Keith Community Radio, used to use 102.8 FM from MFR during evenings but now broadcasts under its own licence 24/7 on 107.7 FM.
 SpeySound Radio (Aviemore), used to use 96.6 FM from MFR during evenings but now broadcasts under its own licence 24/7 on 107.1 FM.
 Kinnaird Radio (Fraserburgh), used to use 96.7 FM from MFR during evenings but has now ceased broadcasting.
 Oban FM (Oban) used to use 103.3 FM from MFR during their RSL period in 1992 and again in 1995. MFR was broadcast on 103.3 FM in Oban during non-broadcasting hours in the afternoons and from late night until the early morning. Since Oban FM officially launched in 1996, the 103.3 FM frequency in Oban broadcasts Clyde 2 from Glasgow as their sustaining service during non-broadcasting hours.
 Nevis Radio (Fort William) used to carry MFR as their sustaining service up until mid 2000's providing news & overnight service. MFR was broadcast over Nevis Radio's 4 frequencies, 96.6, 97.0, 102.3 & 102.4 FM

Programming
Networked programming originates from Clyde 1 in Clydebank, Forth 1 in Edinburgh and Hits Radio in Manchester.

Local programming is produced and broadcast from the MFR studios in the Scorguie area of Inverness on weekdays from 6-10am, presented by Jodie McCluskey.

All of MFR 2's programming is carried from Greatest Hits Radio's network of locally branded Scottish stations with some off-peak output also carried from GHR's sister network in England. 

Networked programming originates from the studios of Clyde 2 in Clydebank, Tay 2 in Dundee, Forth 2 in Edinburgh and from Greatest Hits Radio's Birmingham, Nottingham, London and Manchester studios.

News 
MFR broadcasts local news bulletins hourly from 6am to 7pm on weekdays and from 7am to 1pm on Saturdays and Sundays. Headlines are broadcast on the half hour during weekday breakfast and drivetime shows, alongside sport and traffic bulletins.

National bulletins from Sky News Radio are carried overnight with bespoke networked Scottish bulletins at weekends, produced from Radio Clyde's newsroom in Clydebank.

References

External links
 Ofcom profile
 MFR
 MFR 2
 MDS975's Moray Firth Radio page

Bauer Radio
Greatest Hits Radio
Hits Radio
Moray
Mass media in Inverness
Radio stations established in 1982
1982 establishments in Scotland